The metals of antiquity are  the seven metals which humans had identified and found use for in prehistoric times in Europe and the Middle East: gold, silver, copper, tin, lead, iron, and mercury.  These seven are the metals from which the modern world was forged; until the discovery of antimony in the 9th century, and arsenic in the 13th (both now classified as metalloids), these were the only known elemental metals, compared to approximately 90 known today.

Characteristics

Melting point
The metals of antiquity generally have low melting points, with iron being the exception.
 Mercury melts at −38.829 °C (-37.89 °F)  (being liquid at room temperature).
 Tin melts at 231 °C (449 °F)
 Lead melts at 327 °C (621 °F) 
 Silver at 961 °C (1763 °F) 
 Gold at 1064 °C (1947 °F)
 Copper at 1084 °C (1984 °F)
 Iron is the outlier at 1538 °C (2800 °F), making it far more difficult to melt in antiquity. Cultures developed ironworking proficiency at different rates; however, evidence from the Near East suggests that smelting was possible but impractical circa 1500 BC, and relatively commonplace across most of Eurasia by 500 BC. However, until this period, generally known as the Iron Age, ironwork would have been impossible.

Extraction
While all the metals of antiquity but tin and lead occur natively, only gold and silver are commonly found as the native metal. 
 Gold and silver occur frequently in their native form
 Mercury compounds are reduced to elemental mercury simply by low-temperature heating (500 °C).
 Tin and iron occur as oxides and can be reduced with carbon monoxide (produced by, for example, burning charcoal) at 900 °C.
 Copper and lead compounds can be roasted to produce the oxides, which are then reduced with carbon monoxide at 900 °C.
 Meteoric iron is often found as the native metal and it was the earliest source for iron objects known to humanity

Rarity
While widely known during antiquity, most of these metals are by no means common.
 Iron is the 4th most abundant element in the Earth's crust (approximately 50,000ppm, or 4.1% by mass)
 Copper is next at 26th (50ppm)
 Lead is 37th (14ppm)
 Tin is 49th (2.2ppm)
 Silver is 65th (70ppb)
 Mercury is 66th (50ppb)
 Gold is the 72nd (1.1ppb)
Yet all were known and available in tangible quantities in ancient times. 

Additionally, despite being approximately 1,000 times more abundant in the crust than the next most abundant ancient metal, iron was the last to become available due to its melting point (see above), including requiring tools made from alloys such as bronze to work in quantity. Other comparably abundant elements, such as titanium (approximately 4,400ppm) and aluminium (approximately 83,000ppm), were not available until the modern era. This was due almost entirely to the huge quantities of energy required to purify ores of these elements. Energy requirements and tool availability were, therefore, the primary limiting factors affecting an ancient civilisation's ability to access metals, rather than those metals' relative abundances.

See also
Timeline of chemical element discoveries
Ashtadhatu, the eight metals of Hindu alchemy
History of metallurgy in the Indian subcontinent
History of metallurgy in China
Metallurgy in pre-Columbian America
Copper metallurgy in Africa
Iron metallurgy in Africa

Symbolism

The practice of alchemy in the Western world, based on a Hellenistic and Babylonian approach to planetary astronomy, often ascribed a symbolic association between the seven then-known celestial bodies and the metals known to the Greeks and Babylonians during antiquity. Additionally, some alchemists and astrologers believed there was an association, sometimes called a rulership, between days of the week, the alchemical metals, and the planets that were said to hold "dominion" over them.

References

Further reading

 http://www.webelements.com/ cited from these sources:
 A.M. James and M.P. Lord in Macmillan's Chemical and Physical Data, Macmillan, London, UK, 1992.
 G.W.C. Kaye and T.H. Laby in Tables of physical and chemical constants, Longman, London, UK, 15th edition, 1993.

Metals
History of metallurgy